"Caroline's a Victim" is the debut single by English singer-songwriter Kate Nash, released digitally and on 7" vinyl 5 February 2007. "Caroline's a Victim" was a popular track on Kate Nash's MySpace profile. It is also featured on the CD Moshi Moshi Singles Compilation, and appears on the CD single for her song "Foundations". The B-side, "Birds", later featured on her début album, Made of Bricks. It has sold a total of 2,000 copies in the U.K. It was written about Caroline Davis, who she went to the BRIT School with. She was a "Victim" because that was what fans of the band The Killers called themselves.

The music video for "Caroline's a Victim" consists of Nash playing various instruments while singing. The Teenagers Myspace page is visible in the video. It was directed by Kinga Burza.

Track listing

CD
 "Caroline's a Victim" - track 4 on Moshi Moshi Singles Compilation
 "Birds" (Original Version) - track 5 on début album Made of Bricks

References

2007 debut singles
Kate Nash songs
Songs written by Kate Nash
2006 songs